The Schelmentoren in Heerlen is a Medieval Building that has served as a defendable living tower for the Here van Are (sometimes called the counts van Ahr-Hochstaden) and their successors.  As part of the Landsfort Herle, it served as a prison tower. It is believed to be built on command of Theoderich van Are. What is certain is that the building existed in the 12th century.

Name
Although now known as the Schelmentoren, it has had many names (Bickelstein (or Bickersteyntoren )).  In the year 1225 it was part of landsfort Herle (sometimes referred to as Castrum)

See also 
 Pancratiuskerk

References

Defunct prisons in the Netherlands
Towers in Limburg (Netherlands)
Castles in South Limburg (Netherlands)
Rijksmonuments in Heerlen